Dennis Marks may refer to:

 Dennis Marks (screenwriter) (1932–2006), American screenwriter, producer and voice actor
 Dennis Marks (music director) (1948–2015), head of music at BBC Television
 Dennis Howard Marks (1945–2016), Welsh drug smuggler and author